The name 2021 Pantelhó mass kidnapping refers to events that occurred on 26 July 2021, in Pantelhó, administrative seat of the municipality of Pantelhó, in the state of Chiapas, Mexico, when a self-defense group called El Machete, from that municipality, arrived at the aforementioned town and took 21 inhabitants. under the argument that they (the members of El Machete) were looking for people involved in organized crime.

The El Machete Self-Defense Group is made up of some 500 Tzotzils and Tzeltals amerindians from the town of Pantelhó. The Municipal Council of Pantelhó, chaired by Pedro Cortés López, considers that the Herreras constitute a criminal band that for two decades controlled that coffee-producing municipality of the Chiapas Highlands, and they attribute to them the sale of drugs, dispossession of land and farms, and the murder of 200 people. Members of the group El Machete point out that the 21 disappeared merchants from Pantelhó are collaborators of the Herreras. Likewise, they deny having participated in the kidnapping and disappearance.

Relatives of the disappeared ones demonstrated on 25 October 2021 behind the Government Palace of Tuxtla Gutiérrez, the capital city of Chiapas, demanding to see their loved ones. They stated that despite the existence of investigation file number 323, the authorities have not done their job.

On 17 December 2021, relatives of the disappeared ones went to the offices of the State Human Rights Commission of Chiapas (CEDH, Comisión Estatal de Derechos Humanos), in Tuxtla Gutiérrez, accompanied by Wenceslao López Vega, an official from the General Secretariat of Government, and there, Pantelhoan Francisca Fidencia Morales Monterrosa, 72 years old, accused Pedro Cortés López, whom the Congress of the State of Chiapas appointed president of the Municipal Council of Pantelhó, of kidnapping the 21. Most of the claimants remain refugees in San Cristóbal de las Casas, because there are no guarantees to return to their town.

Relatives of the 21 disappeared ones have declared that some members of the armed group El Machete have telephoned them to threaten them with death, that there has been no progress in the search, and that the authorities are only delaying action.

See also 
 2014 Iguala mass kidnapping

References 

Chiapas
Human rights abuses in Mexico
Kidnappings in Mexico
Mass murder in 2021
Massacres in Mexico
Massacres of men
Attacks in Mexico in 2021
Articles containing video clips
July 2021 events in Mexico
Mass disappearances
2021 murders in Mexico
Violence against men in North America